The River Rawthey is a river in Cumbria in northwest England.

The headwaters of the Rawthey are at Rawthey Gill Foot, where Rawthey Gill meets Haskhaw Gill.  The source of Rawthey Gill is unclear, but is either on Knoutberry Haw or near to the East Tarns of Baugh Fell. Moving initially northwards, the Rawthey picks up Whin Stone Gill in Uldale before skirting round Bluecaster, after which the river runs south-southwest through Cautley. The Rawthey is joined by the Clough River, coming from Garsdale, near Dowbiggin, and, having run past Castleshaw Tower, the River Dee close to Sedbergh. The Rawthey joins the Lune at Stangerthwaite soon afterwards.

Most of the country through which the Rawthey runs is part of the historic West Riding of Yorkshire.

Rawthey
History of Yorkshire
1Rawthey